BIV may refer to:
  Bovine immunodeficiency virus, a cattle virus similar to HIV
  Brain in a vat, a scenario for thought experiments

See also
 B4 (disambiguation), including a list of topics named B.IV, etc.